Swiss Army Man is a 2016 American surrealist comedy-drama film written and directed by Daniel Scheinert and Daniel Kwan (in their respective feature directorial debuts). The film stars Paul Dano, Daniel Radcliffe, and Mary Elizabeth Winstead.

Swiss Army Man premiered at the 2016 Sundance Film Festival on January 22, and began a theatrical limited release in the United States on June 24, 2016, before opening wide on July 1, 2016. The film was positively received by critics.

Plot
Hank Thompson, a man marooned on an island, is on the verge of hanging himself, but sees a corpse wash up on the beach. He tries to resuscitate it, but the corpse bemuses him with its incessant flatulence. As the tide begins to wash the corpse away, Hank watches as its flatulence propels the corpse around on the surface of the water. Hank immediately mounts the corpse and rides it across the ocean like a jet ski, landing on a mainland shore but far from civilization. That night, the two of them hide in a cave from a rainstorm, and after the runoff pours into the corpse's mouth, Hank realizes the next morning that the corpse has yet another power: it can be used like a well for a seemingly infinite source of drinkable water. The corpse also begins a slow transition into speaking and acquires a grasp of the English language, adopting the name Manny. Hank and Manny continue their quest, using Manny's erections (fueled by a swimsuit magazine they find) as a compass. Manny has forgotten everything about his former life, and Hank tries to teach him various concepts about life, but Manny's childlike and shameless interpretations of these concepts conflict with what Hank considers socially acceptable behavior.

Over the course of their journey, Hank teaches Manny the joys of eating out, going to movies, and partying, using crudely-constructed props and sets made from plants and garbage they find. Using these, Hank leads Manny to believe that Manny is in love with a woman named Sarah, who rides the bus alone every day. Manny falls in love with Sarah, and it is this love that motivates him to try to find civilization with Hank. In reality, Hank is very much in love with Sarah, having seen her riding the bus every day but never talking to her due to his own shyness. He has a photo of her that he took secretly while on the bus set as the wallpaper on his phone and follows her on social media. As he looks through photos, it is revealed that Sarah is happily married and has a child.

Hank impersonates Sarah to help Manny learn how to talk to women, but they end up connecting and kiss. They have a falling out after Hank reveals that Manny never knew Sarah during his life. Feeling betrayed over Hank's hypocrisy and self-restraint, Manny states he wishes to be fully dead again. At this time, Hank experiences strange mental flashes of surreal images recalling his journey and suggests that one of Manny's powers is to affect his mind. Despite the tension between them, when Hank is attacked by a bear, Manny moves under his own power for the first time, crawling after his injured friend and igniting one of his farts from their campfire to scare the bear away. Hank loses consciousness and wakes up to Manny carrying him to Sarah's house, despite Hank's protests.

While Sarah is in the house, Manny talks to Sarah's daughter, Crissie. Expecting her to be impressed, he demonstrates several of his powers, inadvertently frightening her with his compass-erection, which Hank quickly slaps down. Sarah is alerted by her daughter's crying and calls the police at the sight of Hank and Manny's once-again inanimate corpse. Hank is soon patched up, but the cops discover the photos of Sarah on his phone and become suspicious. Hank's father also appears, mistaking Manny's corpse for Hank when asked by the paramedics to confirm his identity. After being interviewed by the local television news and deliriously professing on air his gratitude for Manny and his magical powers, Hank runs away with Manny's body. Hank's pursuers discover the structures he built which in actuality seem to be quite close to Sarah's house, as if he had been there some time instead of journeying through the forest. The police, Sarah, her husband, her daughter, a reporter, a camera man, and Hank's father all follow him to the beach. Cornered, Hank lets out a long fart and he is taken away by the police. Manny then begins to fart violently. To everyone's shock, horror, and in Crissie and Hank's father's case, amusement, Manny floats back into the ocean and skims quickly away, propelled by his own flatulence, as he and Hank share one last smile.

Cast

 Paul Dano as Hank Thompson
 Daniel Radcliffe as Manny
 Mary Elizabeth Winstead as Sarah Johnson
 Timothy Eulich as Preston
 Marika Casteel as Reporter
 Richard Gross as Hank's Dad
 Antonia Ribero as Crissie
 Aaron Marshall as Police Officer
 Andy Hull as Cameraman
 Shane Carruth as Coroner

Production

In June 2015, Paul Dano, Daniel Radcliffe and Mary Elizabeth Winstead joined the cast of the film, with Daniel Kwan and Daniel Scheinert set to direct from a screenplay written by the two. Principal photography began on July 14, 2015, and ended on August 7, 2015. Filming took place over the course of 22 days throughout California, including in San Pedro and Humboldt County for underwater work and wide vistas, respectively. Daniel Radcliffe said that music from the film was played on set: "Robert composed music before the shoot started which never ever happens in film. We could hear the music on set for certain scenes."

Release
Swiss Army Man had its world premiere at the Sundance Film Festival on January 22, 2016. Shortly after, A24 acquired U.S rights to the film, and later acquired global rights to the film, partnering with distributors who had already acquired global rights. The film was originally scheduled to be released on June 17, 2016, but was later pushed back a week to June 24, in a limited bow. It opened in a wide release on July 1.

Reception

Critical response

Swiss Army Man has received generally positive reviews from film critics. Review aggregation website Rotten Tomatoes gives it a 72% approval rating, based on reviews from 211 critics, with an average rating of 6.8/10. The site's critical consensus states: "Disarmingly odd and thoroughly well-acted, Swiss Army Man offers adventurous viewers an experience as rewarding as it is impossible to categorize." Metacritic gives the film a rating of 64 out of 100, based on reviews from 36 critics, indicating "generally favorable reviews".

During the film's world premiere at Sundance, some audience members walked out, alienated by the film's bizarre premise.

Peter Debruge of Variety gave the film a positive review, writing, "On one hand the most singularly unique competition title to debut at Sundance in ages, while on the other, a project still in drastic need of development (despite a tour through five different Sundance Institute labs, including one for mixing all those fart effects in Dolby Atmos), this movie wears its weirdness as a badge of honor—as well it should." Leslie Felperin of The Hollywood Reporter felt that "forming a counterpoint to all the bodily function knockabout, Dano and Radcliffe, both fully committing with delectable zeal, project a certain tragic fragility that adds heft to the proceedings."

Accolades

References

External links
 
 
 
 
 

2016 films
2016 black comedy films
2016 comedy-drama films
2016 fantasy films
2016 independent films
2016 directorial debut films
2010s buddy comedy films
2010s English-language films
2010s fantasy comedy films
2010s survival films
A24 (company) films
American black comedy films
American comedy-drama films
American buddy comedy films
American fantasy comedy films
American independent films
American survival films
American zombie comedy films
Films about friendship
Films set on uninhabited islands
Flatulence in popular culture
Absurdist fiction
Surrealist films
Surreal comedy films
Magic realism films
Films shot in California
Films shot in Los Angeles
2010s American films